Phạm Ngũ Lão street is located in District 1 of Ho Chi Minh City, formerly Saigon, Vietnam. It was named after Phạm Ngũ Lão, the national hero. The intersection of Phạm Ngũ Lão and Đề Thám streets are referred to as the backpacker district of Saigon. This area is frequented by Ho Chi Minh city locals and tourist who flock to the area markets (both open air and indoors) to buy cheap clothes (some of which are counterfeit), DVDs, souvenirs, and war memorabilia. The many bars and cafes in this district are conveniently located near Saigon's city centre. In the Vietnamese language, this area is called "khu Tay ba lo" (Backpacker's area).

The Phạm Ngũ Lão area is known for its affordable guest houses and mini-hotels as well as the availability of tourist agencies which primarily cater to budget tourists, similar to Khao San Road in Bangkok, Thailand.

References

External links
'SaigonNezumi
'

Streets in Ho Chi Minh City
Populated places in Ho Chi Minh City